Rybna may refer to the following places:
Rybna, Lesser Poland Voivodeship (south Poland)
Rybna, Opole Voivodeship (south-west Poland)
Rybna, Silesian Voivodeship (south Poland)